Xitong Shizhu Houdi, born Shi (适), was the son of Sutuhu. He succeeded Yifa Yulüti in 59 AD and ruled until 63 AD. In 62 AD he helped the Han dynasty in repelling Northern Xiongnu from Wuyuan and Yunzhong commanderies. He was succeeded by his cousin Qiuchu Julinti.

Footnotes

References

Bichurin N.Ya., "Collection of information on peoples in Central Asia in ancient times", vol. 1, Sankt Petersburg, 1851, reprint Moscow-Leningrad, 1950

Taskin B.S., "Materials on Sünnu history", Science, Moscow, 1968, p. 31 (In Russian)

Chanyus